Encarna is a given name. Notable people with the given name include:

Encarna Abad (born 1927), Spanish actress
Encarna Granados (born 1972), Spanish race walker
Encarna Paso (1931–2019), Spanish film and television actress
Encarna Sánchez (1935–1996), Spanish talk radio host and current events commentator